No. 229 Squadron RAF was a squadron of the Royal Air Force, and is an officially accredited Battle of Britain Squadron. It became No. 603 Squadron RAF in January 1945.

History

Formation and World War I
No. 229 Squadron RAF was formed on 20 August 1918 at Great Yarmouth. It was made up from Nos 428, 429, 454 and 455 Flights of the Royal Naval Air Service.  The squadron's role was to fly coastal patrols. It continued with this until the end of the war and was officially disbanded on 31 December 1919.

World War II
On 6 October 1939, 229 Sqn was reformed at RAF Digby as a Fighter squadron and was equipped with Blenheims for a role protecting shipping. The squadron began convoy patrols on 21 December but also carried out night training and radar trials. In March 1940, the squadron was re-equipped with Hurricanes and soon after the German invasion of France in May 1940, sent one flight to reinforce the French-based fighter squadrons for eight days during the Battle of France. After flying defensive patrols over the East Coast, No 229 moved to RAF Northolt in September and remained there for the rest of the Battle of Britain. ACM (then Sqn Ldr) Frederick Rosier was a flight commander on the squadron during this time.

In December 1940 the squadron moved to Merseyside and in May 1941 left for the Middle East. On arrival the first detachment was attached to No. 274 Squadron RAF to cover the evacuation of Crete and the second detachment was divided between Nos. 6, 208 and 213 Squadrons. A flight was transferred from No. 274 to No.73 Squadron on 11 June as the latters C Flight, and remained detached in Egypt at the end of July. It was September before the squadron began functioning as an independent unit. Fighter sweeps were flown over Libya until the end of March 1942 when the squadron was transferred to Malta to reinforce the islands fighter defences. On 29 April 1942, it ceased to function, its surviving aircraft and pilots being absorbed by other units.

On 3 August 1942, 229 Sqn reformed at RAF Ta Kali, Malta from No. 603 Squadron and flew Spitfires in Defence of Malta during the last months of the siege. In January 1943 the island's squadrons took the offensive, flying sweeps over Sicily, and in May 229 Sqn began to operate fighter-bombers. After covering the landings in Sicily, in July 1943, the squadron remained in Malta for defensive duties until January 1944, when it moved to Sicily.

On 1 April 1944, it was withdrawn for transfer to the UK and re-assembled at RAF Hornchurch on 24 April. During Operation Overlord (the Allied invasion of Normandy) it was equipped with the Spitfire IX F, operating from RAF Detling in Air Defence of Great Britain (ADGB), though under the operational control of RAF Second Tactical Air Force (2nd TAF). After providing escort missions over the Low countries it re-equipped with Spitfire XVIs in December, and then flew fighter-bomber sweeps until renumbered No. 603 Squadron RAF on 10 January 1945.

See also
List of Royal Air Force aircraft squadrons

Notes

References

 Ken Delve, D-Day: The Air Battle, London: Arms & Armour Press, 1994, .
 Halley, James J. The Squadrons of the Royal Air Force & Commonwealth, 1981–1988. Tonbridge, Kent, UK: Air-Britain (Historians) Ltd., 1988. .
 Jefford, C.G. RAF Squadrons, a Comprehensive Record of the Movement and Equipment of all RAF Squadrons and their Antecedents since 1912. Shrewsbury, Shropshire, UK: Airlife Publishing, 2001. .
 Rawlings, John D.R. Coastal, Support and Special Squadrons of the RAF and their Aircraft. London: Jane's Publishing Company Ltd., 1982. .
 Rawlings, John D.R. Fighter Squadrons of the RAF and their Aircraft. London: Macdonald and Jane's (Publishers) Ltd., 1978. .
 Robinson, Anthony. RAF Squadrons in the Battle of Britain. London: Arms and Armour Press Ltd., 1987 (republished 1999 by Brockhampton Press, .).

External links

 squadron histories of nos. 226–230 sqn

Military units and formations established in 1918
229
RAF squadrons involved in the Battle of Britain
1918 establishments in the United Kingdom